The hungry judge effect is a finding that judges were more inclined to be lenient after a meal but more severe before the break.  It has been suggested that this may be an artifact of the scheduling of cases, based on their likely outcome and duration.

Original study
A study of the decisions of Israeli parole boards was made in 2011.  This found that the granting of parole was 65% at the start of a session but would drop to nearly zero before a meal break.  The paper Extraneous factors in judicial decisions, which was published in the Proceedings of the National Academy of Sciences, has been cited many times – 1,380 times by 2021.

Hypotheses
The original paper suggested that mental depletion as a result of fatigue caused decisions to increasingly favour the status quo, while rest and replenishment then restored a willingness to make bold decisions.  Later analyses and simulations suggested that the result might arise from scheduling priorities – that cases with a lenient outcome required more time and so would not be scheduled in the time remaining before a break.

Consequences
Interventions of AI and algorithms in the court such as COMPAS software are usually motivated by hungry judge effect. However, some argue that the hungry judge effect is overstated in justifying the use of AI in law.

References

Cognitive biases
Decision-making